Aleš Bárta (born 1960 in Rychnov nad Kněžnou, Czech Republic) is a Czech Organist.

He began his studies at the Brno Conservatory (under Josef Pukl) and continued at the Academy of Music in Prague (Vaclav Rabas). He appears as soloist with leading Czech symphony and chamber orchestras, among them the Prague Symphony orchestra FOK, the Czech Radio Symphony Orchestra, the Prague Chamber Orchestra and the Czech Philharmonic. During his tour of Japan his appearance marked the opening of a new concert hall in Yokohama.

Prizes 
1982 - won the Anton Bruckner International Organ Competition in Linz
1983 - prize winner at the Franz Liszt International Organ Competition in Budapest
1984 - absolute winner of the Prague Spring International Organ Competition

External links 
 ArcoDiva.cz
 Bach - Cantatas.com

Czech classical organists
Male classical organists
1960 births
Living people
21st-century organists
21st-century Czech male musicians
Brno Conservatory alumni